İscehisar District is a district of Afyonkarahisar Province of Turkey. Its seat is the town İscehisar. Its area is 489 km2, and its population is 24,999 (2021).

Composition
There are two municipalities in İscehisar District:
 İscehisar
 Seydiler

There are 11 villages in İscehisar District:

 Alanyurt
 Bahçecik
 Çalışlar
 Çatağıl
 Cevizli
 Doğanlar
 Doğlat
 Karaağaç
 Karakaya
 Konarı
 Olukpınar

Economy
The province of Afyonkarahisar is famed for the quality of its marble, most of which is quarried in the district of İscehisar.

References

External links
 District governor's official website 

Districts of Afyonkarahisar Province